Robert McFadden may refer to:

 Robert A. McFadden, Vice President of Crius Energy's Viridian Energy in Australia
 Robert D. McFadden (born 1937), American journalist
 Bob McFadden (1923–2000), American voice actor
 Robert L. McFadden, South Carolina politician